The Temple is a historic octagon-shaped Baptist church building on Temple Avenue in the Ocean Park area of Old Orchard Beach, Maine.  Built in 1881, it is the centerpiece of the summer camp meeting established in 1880 by Free Will Baptists led by Bates College President Oren Cheney.  It is the only known octagonal religious structure currently in use in the state.  It was listed on the National Register of Historic Places in 1975, and included in the Ocean Park Historic Buildings district in 1982.

Description and history
The Temple is set on the north side of Temple Avenue, in an area known as Temple Square.  Flanking it are two other buildings associated with the camp meeting: Porter Hall and B.C. Jordan Memorial Hall.  It is a two-story wood frame structure, capped by an octagonal hip roof whose elements meet at a central cupola.  It is finished in wooden clapboards and rests on a foundation of brick piers.  The main facade, facing south, is three bays wide, with a central projecting entry section topped by a doubled gable roof.  This section has a double door on the first level and a double sash window above, while the flanking bays have single sash windows.  The east and west-facing walls have similar organization, but only a single gable roof.  The north wall has a low storage area projecting from it.  The interior of the building is a large open hall, with the speaker's platform on the north wall, and seating, much of it original, arrayed facing it.

The idea of an oceanfront camp meeting community arose at a meeting of Free Will Baptists in Weirs Beach, New Hampshire in 1880.  Land was acquired in northern Saco (which Old Orchard Beach was then still part of), and summer cottages were soon built.  This building was constructed in 1881 by James Bickford to a design by Dow & Wheeler, inspired in part by the popularization of octagon houses by Orson Squire Fowler in the 1840s and 1850s.  The Temple continues to be a central focus of the summer community in Ocean Park.

See also
National Register of Historic Places listings in York County, Maine

References

Churches completed in 1881
19th-century Baptist churches in the United States
Baptist churches in Maine
Octagonal churches in the United States
Churches on the National Register of Historic Places in Maine
Old Orchard Beach, Maine
National Register of Historic Places in York County, Maine
Historic district contributing properties in Maine
1881 establishments in Maine
Camp meeting grounds